Federal Highway 281 (Carretera Federal 281) is a Federal Highway of Mexico, located entirely within the state of Yucatán. It connects Celestún to Mérida, with a  spur from Hunucmá to Sisal. Within Mérida, the street is known as Avenida Jacinto Canek.

References

281